is a Japanese voice actor who works for Arts Vision.

Takeuchi learned voice acting at the Institute of Japan Narration Act. In 2000, he debuted as a main character in the video game Photogenic, and in 2003, he played one of the main characters, Ranmaru Miura, in Dear Boys (also known as Hoop Days). He is also known for his roles as main character Keita Suminoe in Kiss×Sis, and Lithuania in Hetalia: Axis Powers.

Filmography

Anime

Television 
2002
 Princess Tutu (2002), male student (ep 7)
 Haibane Renmei (2002), customer (at clothes shop, ep 8)
 Knight Hunters Eternity (2002) (ep 13)

2003
 Detective Loki (2003), crook B (ep 8)
 Mermaid Melody: Pichi Pichi Pitch (2003), Galeos (ep 55)
 Dear Boys (2003), Ranmaru Miura
 Da Capo (2003), male student 1 (ep 1)
 Green Green (2003), Yuusuke Takazaki
 Popotan (2003), young man (ep 5)
 Full Metal Panic? Fumoffu (2003), photo club member B (ep 11)
 Bobobo-bo Bo-bobo (2003), Tenbobo (eps 66–67)
 Chrono Crusade (2003), teen
 Stellvia (2003), Ian

2004
 Samurai Champloo (2004), bodyguard (ep 11), member (ep 18)
 Elfen Lied (2004), policeman C (ep 9), Satou (ep 3)
 ToHeart: Remember My Memories (2004) (ep 11)
 Major (2004), Oikawa (ep 27-)

2005
 Ichigo 100% (2005), schoolboy (eps 1–2)
 Loveless (2005), Kaidoh Kio
 Best Student Council (2005), Hitoshi Sato (ep 18), male student 1 (ep 10)
 Black Cat (2005), Kevin

2006
 Gakuen Heaven (2006), Kakeru Ozawa
 Kiba (2006), Bryan, Deucem (eps 40–46), Guzma, Jeva, Rebel D (ep 11), soldier (ep 2), young man 2 (ep 6)

2009
 Hetalia - Axis Powers (2009), Lithuania
 Hetalia World Series (2010), Lithuania

2010
 Kiss×sis (2010), Keita Suminoe

2013
 Brothers Conflict (2013), Louis Asahina

2014
 Haikyuu (2014), Komaki

2016
 Sakamoto desu ga? (2016), Mario

Original video animations 
 Green Green: Erolutions (2004), Yuusuke Takazaki
 Elfen Lied (2005), SAT member
 Kiss×sis (2008), Keita Suminoe

Film 
 Garasu no Usagi (2005), Haruki Kawashima

Video games 
 Brothers Conflict: Brilliant Blue, Louis Asahina
 Brothers Conflict: Passion Pink, Louis Asahina
 Etude Prologue, Nachi Katagiri
 Teikoku Sensenki, Kisharaku
 Radiata Stories

Drama CDs 
 3 Shake (2009), Okazaki
 Aiso Tsukashi (2011), Shuuya Kasuga
 Amai Kuchizuke (2002), Basketball Club Captain & Drama Club Director
 Chocolate no Youni (2008), Kyouichi Shizuka
Hakuu Series 1: Hakuu (2008), Nachi Mizusawa
Hakuu Series 2: Jiu (2009), Nachi Mizusawa
Hakuu Series 3: Awayuki (2009), Nachi Mizusawa
 Hetalia: Axis Powers (2008–2009), Lithuania
 Kimi to Te wo Tsunaide (2007), Fuui Shindou
 Kiss×Sis, Keita Suminoe
 Loveless, Kio Kaido
 Love Neco (2007), Necoco
 Ogamiya Yokochou Tenmatsuki S (Esu) Series 2: Kamiato (2006), Mao Takanashi
 The Rose of Versailles II, Jeanne
 TV-kun no Kimochi (2009), (Souta Karasuma)
 Yume Miru Seiza (2008)
 Zenryousei Sakurabayashi Kan Gakuin ～Gothic～ Hana no Mizo Shiru'' (2009), Misaki Shouta

References

External links 
 Official agency profile at Arts Vision 
 
 Ken Takeuchi at GamePlaza Haruka Voice Acting Database 

1978 births
Living people
Japanese male voice actors
21st-century Japanese male actors
Arts Vision voice actors